The Hispaniolan giant tree frog (Osteopilus vastus), or Hispaniola tree frog, is a species of frog in the family Hylidae endemic to Hispaniola, found in both the Dominican Republic and Haiti.

Taxonomy
Populations from the southern part of Hispaniola may represent a separate, as yet undescribed species.

Distribution
It is patchily distributed in across the island. They are primarily found in mesic broadleaf forests but also in a range of agricultural habitats, such as cacao and coffee plantations and pastures. They can be found high in the canopy (up to 15 m). They are often found along creeks and streams; males call from trees overhanging running water. Eggs are also deposited in running water.

Conservation
The species is threatened by habitat loss caused by degradation of streams and deforestation.

References

Osteopilus
Endemic fauna of Hispaniola
Amphibians of the Dominican Republic
Frogs of Haiti
Amphibians described in 1871
Taxonomy articles created by Polbot